Sherrer is a surname. Notable people with the surname include:

Ben Sherrer (born 1968), American politician
Gary Sherrer (Oklahoma politician), American politician
Gary Sherrer (born 1940), American politician
Larry Sherrer (born 1950), American football player